Gamma-aminobutyric acid receptor subunit alpha-4 is a protein that in humans is encoded by the GABRA4 gene.

GABA is the major inhibitory neurotransmitter in the mammalian brain where it acts at GABA-A receptors, which are ligand-gated chloride channels. Chloride conductance of these channels can be modulated by agents such as benzodiazepines that bind to the GABA-A receptor. At least 16 distinct subunits of GABA-A receptors have been identified.

A research study compared wild-type to knockout GABRA4 gene in mice. It was determined that the elimination of the GABRA4 gene displayed characteristics that are associated with autism spectrum disorder (ASD). These include increased spatial cognition and decreased social engagement, unlike the wild-type mice. A hippocampal transcriptome analysis was profiled on knockout mice, showing the increased activity of N-methyl-D-aspartate receptors. This plays a role in consciousness and learning resulting in those characteristics.

See also
 GABAA receptor

References

Further reading

External links 
 

Ion channels